Rare, Precious and Beautiful, Volume 2 is a compilation released by the Bee Gees in 1968 on Polydor Records in the UK and Karussell Records in Germany. The album was released in the US on Atco Records in 1970. The songs were recorded between 1963 and 1966.

The release was followed by a Volume 3.

Track listing

References

Bee Gees compilation albums
1968 compilation albums